Astrabe is a small genus of gobies native to the marine waters around Japan.

Species
There are currently three recognized species in this genus:
 Astrabe fasciata Akihito & Meguro, 1988
 Astrabe flavimaculata Akihito & Meguro, 1988
 Astrabe lactisella D. S. Jordan & Snyder, 1901

References

Gobiidae
Taxa named by David Starr Jordan